April 15 - Eastern Orthodox liturgical calendar - April 17

All fixed commemorations below are observed on April 29 by Eastern Orthodox Churches on the Old Calendar.

For April 16th, Orthodox Churches on the Old Calendar commemorate the Saints listed on April 3.

Saints

 Martyrs Leonidas of Nea Epidavros, and those with him (250 or 258): 
 Charissa, Nika (Niki), Galina, Callista (Calisa, Calida), Nunechia, Basilissa, Theodora, and Irene, of Corinth. 
 Hieromartyrs Felix, Bishop of Spoleto, and Januarius, Presbyter, and Martyrs Septeminus and Fortunatus, of Lycaonia (294 or 304)  (see also: August 30)
 Virgin-martyrs Agape, Irene, and Chionia of Aquileia, in Thessaloniki (304)  (see also: April 3)
 Saints Agatho, Eutychia, Cassia and Phillippa, the Confessors, in Thessaloniki, by imprisonment (304)

Pre-Schism Western saints

 Virgin-martyr Encratia (Encratis, Encratide, Engracia), who suffered terribly for her faith in Saragossa in Spain (c. 304)
 The Eighteen Martyrs of Saragossa (c. 304):   (see also: November 3)
 Optatus, Lupercus, Successus, Martial, Urban, Julia, Quintilian, Publius, Fronto, Felix, Caecilian, Eventius, Primitivus, Apodemius and four named Saturninus.
 Saint Turibius of Astorga, Bishop of Astorga in Spain and a valiant defender of Orthodoxy (c. 460)
 Saint Vasius (Vaise, Vaize), a rich citizen of Saintes in France, murdered by his relatives for giving his property to the poor (c. 500)
 Saint Turibius of Palencia, founder of the monastery of Liébana in Asturias in Spain (c. 528)
 Saint Paternus (Pair), Bishop of Avranches (c. 574 or 563)  (see also: April 15)
 Saint Fructuosus of Braga in Iberia (665)
 Saint Lambert of Saragossa, a servant who was martyred near Saragossa by his Saracen master (c. 900)
 Saint Herveus of Tours (Hervé), monk at the monastery of St Martin of Tours, and hermit (1021)
 Saint Elias, Monk and Abbot in Ireland and Germany (1042)

Post-Schism Orthodox saints

 Saint Theodora-Bassa, princess of Novgorod (1378)
 Saint John, Fool-for-Christ, of Verkhoturye (1701)
 New Martyr Michael Burliotes of Smyrna, by beheading (1772)
 New Monk-martyr Christopher of Dionysiou, Mt. Athos, at Adrianople (1818)
 New martyrs Christodoulos and Anastasia, in Achaia (1821)
 Saint Ambrose (Khelaia) the Confessor, Catholicos-Patriarch of All Georgia (1927)  (see also: March 16 and March 27)
 Venerable Amphilochios (Makris), Elder, of Patmos (1970) (see also: April 3 - os)

Other commemorations

 Synaxis of the Weeping Icon of the Most Holy Theotokos "Ilyin Chernigov" (1658)  (see also: September 1)
 Synaxis of the Icon of the Mother of God of Tambov (1692)
 Synaxis of All Saints of Euboea.

Icon gallery

Notes

References

Sources
 April 16 / April 29. Orthodox Calendar (pravoslavie.ru).
 April 29 / April 16. Holy Trinity Russian Orthodox Church (A parish of the Patriarchate of Moscow).
 April 16. OCA - The Lives of the Saints.
 The Autonomous Orthodox Metropolia of Western Europe and the Americas. St. Hilarion Calendar of Saints for the year of our Lord 2004. St. Hilarion Press (Austin, TX). p. 29.
 April 16. Latin Saints of the Orthodox Patriarchate of Rome.
 The Roman Martyrology. Transl. by the Archbishop of Baltimore. Last Edition, According to the Copy Printed at Rome in 1914. Revised Edition, with the Imprimatur of His Eminence Cardinal Gibbons. Baltimore: John Murphy Company, 1916. pp. 106–107.
Greek Sources
 Great Synaxaristes:  16 Απριλίου. Μεγασ Συναξαριστησ.
  Συναξαριστής. 16 Απριλίου. ecclesia.gr. (H Εκκλησια Τησ Ελλαδοσ). 
Russian Sources
  29 апреля (16 апреля). Православная Энциклопедия под редакцией Патриарха Московского и всея Руси Кирилла (электронная версия). (Orthodox Encyclopedia - Pravenc.ru).
  16 апреля (ст.ст.) 29 апреля 2013 (нов. ст.). Русская Православная Церковь Отдел внешних церковных связей.

April in the Eastern Orthodox calendar